Muricopsis (Muricopsis) necocheana is a species of sea snail, a marine gastropod mollusk in the family Muricidae, the murex snails or rock snails.

Description
The size of an adult shell varies between 13 mm and 26 mm.

Distribution
This species is distributed in the Southwest Atlantic along Southeast Brazil and Argentina.

References

External links
 

Muricidae
Gastropods described in 1900